This is a list of notable schools in Angola.

Schools 
 Escola Portuguesa de Luanda
 Luanda International School
 Santa Clara School

See also 

 Education in Angola
 Lists of schools

References 

Schools
Schools
Schools
Angola
Angola